Norma Jean & Marilyn is a 1996 made-for-TV biographical film produced by HBO and premiered on May 18, 1996. The film featured Ashley Judd as Norma Jean Dougherty and Mira Sorvino as Marilyn Monroe. It was partially based on the 1989 book Norma Jean: My Secret Life With Marilyn Monroe by actor Ted Jordan (played by Josh Charles), who claimed to have had a years-long relationship with Monroe.

The tagline for the highly fictionalized film summarizes the plot: "Marilyn Monroe was our fantasy. Norma Jean was her reality." In dream-like scenes, Monroe and her former self appear together, with Norma Jean sometimes taunting Marilyn. The original music score was composed by Christopher Young.

It was nominated for five Primetime Emmy Awards and two Golden Globe Awards, each including for both lead actresses.

Cast
 Ashley Judd as Norma Jean Dougherty
 Marianne Davis  as Young Norma Jean
 Kelsey Mulrooney as Child Norma Jean
 Mira Sorvino as Marilyn Monroe
 Josh Charles as Ted Jordan
 Ron Rifkin as Johnny Hyde
 David Dukes as Arthur Miller
 Peter Dobson as Joe DiMaggio
 Taylor Nichols as Fred Karger
 John Rubinstein as Darryl F. Zanuck
 Allan Corduner as  Billy Wilder
 Lindsay Crouse as Natasha Lytess
 Dennis Bowen as Tom Kelley
 Nancy Linehan Charles as Bette Davis
 Jeffrey Combs as Montgomery Clift
 Steven Culp as Robert F. Kennedy
 Lou Cutell as Henry T. Weinstein
 Dana Goldstone as Lee Strasberg
 Micole Mercurio as Mozelle Hyde
 John Apicella as Milton R. Krasner
 Kevin Bourland as David March
 Michael O'Neill as Mr. Kimmel

Production
A cherry-adorned dress Sorvino wore in the film, from The Misfits (1961), was actually worn by Monroe during the filming of the original movie. It was provided to the production by designer and cinema costume collector, Gene London. While filming the movie, Sorvino acquired a small dog whom she named "Deer", after its uncanny resemblance to a Deer. She adored the dog, and kept it in her trailer while filming, so it would be there waiting for her between shots. Once, while filming at The International School of Los Angeles/Lycee International, in the Los Feliz area of Los Angeles, a crew member inadvertently let the dog escape while cleaning Sorvino's trailer as she was on-set filming a shot. The school was located on a small hill, and "Deer" apparently bolted down the hill, and into the residential neighborhood below. Sorvino was inconsolable, and returned to the location nightly, cruising slowly through the area, calling out for her lost pet, and posting Reward Notices. Security Officers who worked overnight shifts on the set were advised of the situation, and were told to be alert to the possibility of Ms. Sorvino's presence, and to keep an eye out for the dog, who may return to the location. Several of the officers and other crew members even began bringing collars, leashes, dog carriers and treats with them to work, hoping to capture it, but the crew moved on to the next filming location, and it is believed that "Deer" was never found.

Critical reception
The film received mixed reviews from critics. Review aggregator Rotten Tomatoes reports that 60% of professional critics gave the film a positive review, with a rating average of 4.8 out of 10.

Awards and nominations

References

External links
 
 
 
 Review from Allmovie
 Entry from HBO film archive
 Photographs of the movie's set design, from the designer's website

1996 television films
1996 films
1990s biographical drama films
American biographical drama films
HBO Films films
Films about Marilyn Monroe
Films distributed by Disney
Films scored by Christopher Young
Cultural depictions of Robert F. Kennedy
Cultural depictions of Joe DiMaggio
Biographical films about actors
LGBT-related drama films
1990s English-language films
American drama television films
Films directed by Tim Fywell
1990s American films